Landsverk (AB Landsverk) was a Swedish heavy industry company, manufacturing military equipment such as tanks, tank destroyers, SPAAGs, armored cars, tracked and wheeled off-road vehicles among others and civilian equipment such as railroad cars, harbour cranes and agricultural machinery.

It was founded in 1872 as Firman Petterson & Ohlsen. It was located in Landskrona, Sweden.

Early days
In late 1920 the company found itself on the verge of bankruptcy. Through a German company, the German Gutehoffnungshütte Aktienverein für Bergbau und Hüttenbereich Oberhausen (GHH), invested heavily and gained control of 50% of the shares.

In 1923 the company manufactured a small number of tracked agricultural tractors based on an American design. The Germans increased their ownership to 61% in 1925, three years later the name was changed to AB Landsverk. In 1929 the German engineer Otto Merker was assigned to Landsverk to develop armoured vehicles, a few prototypes of a German design with both wheels and tracks were manufactured in Landskrona. In 1930 the Swedish Army ordered an armoured car for trials, and a few years later three light tanks on wheels and tracks.

In 1933 Lithuania ordered six, in 1935 the Netherlands twelve Landsverk L181 and in 1937 an order of thirteen L-180 armoured cars. Landsverk presented the L-60 in 1934, the first tank with torsion-bar suspension. There was some very limited export of armoured cars to other countries like Denmark and Finland. Hungary manufactured the L-60 as the Toldi. The Landsverk anti-II was an AA variant of this tank.

Landsverk built a few L-120 light tanks in the 1930s, one of which was exported to Norway, it was the first tank operated by the Norwegian Army.

The modern era
During the Second World War Landsverk designed and partly manufactured, most of the Swedish Army's tanks. At the conclusion of that conflict Landsverk was confiscated by the Swedish state and sold to Kockums.

The Irish Army operated several Landsverk vehicles over the last 80 years. Two L-60 tanks were purchased in 1935 as training vehicles to supplement the single Vickers Mk D. Although three tanks were of dubious military value, budget constraints prevented additional purchases. Both were out of service by 1953 due to a lack of tracks. Both are still in existence, one has been restored to working condition.

The Irish Army also used the L-180 armoured car. The type was adopted to replace the aging Rolls-Royce fleet in 1937. Eight were delivered by 1939, but the last five on order were never delivered due to the outbreak of the Second World War (they were instead taken over and used by Sweden). The same was the case with many other vehicles in the Irish Army, budget constraints meant that the L180s were still in front-line service (albeit up-gunned with 20mm cannon) until 1972. Incredibly, they were then transferred to the Irish Army Reserve, the FCA, where they were kept in service until the mid-1980s. Five are preserved, including one donated to the Swedish Army.

The Landsverk Company produced an armoured scout car based on the Unimog S404 in the late 1950s. The Irish Army purchased 15 of the vehicles (originally intended for the police force in the Belgian Congo), in 1971 at a bargain price. They were intended as a stop-gap vehicle for use until the first Panhard M3 VTT APCs entered service in 1972. The type had excellent off-road capability but poor on-road handling due to a high centre of gravity and several accidents occurred as a result. A four-man dismountable squad arrangement was carried, but space was cramped and in any case a four-man detachment was far too small for any sort of realistic military purpose. Other criticisms were that the gunner's position was too exposed. Eventually the Unimog Scout Cars arrived in Ireland in February 1972, their departure having been delayed by a local peace group who thought they were destined for the Provisional Irish Republican Army. By mid-1978 all had been transferred to the Irish Army Reserve, the FCA. All were withdrawn by 1984, two are preserved; one in the transport museum in Howth Co Dublin and one in England.

Materiel produced by AB Landsverk

References

External links
Dutch Cavalry Museum

Defunct companies of Sweden
Defence companies of Sweden
Manufacturing companies established in 1872
1872 establishments in Sweden
History of the tank